Hans Lohneis (12 April 1895 – 1970) was a German international footballer.

References

1895 births
1970 deaths
Association football defenders
German footballers
Germany international footballers